The Battle of Tuulos was a battle between Finland and the Soviet Union during the Continuation War of 1941 and the Finnish reconquering of Ladoga Karelia. The Finnish commander of the 23rd Infantry Regiment successfully breached Soviet perimeters and destroyed Soviet artillery pieces and supply lines with little Soviet resistance. The attack was assisted by the Finnish Air Force, which bombed Soviet positions and assisted the 23rd Infantry Regiment.

See also
Tuulos

References

Tuulos
1941 in Finland